James Wilford Franklin (October 20, 1919 – November 15, 1991) was a pitcher in Major League Baseball. He pitched in 1 game for the Brooklyn Dodgers during the 1944 season, pitching two innings and giving up three earned runs.

Born in Paris, Illinois, Franklin died in Panama City, Florida.

References

External links

Major League Baseball pitchers
Brooklyn Dodgers players
1919 births
1991 deaths
Baseball players from Illinois
People from Paris, Illinois
Hot Springs Bathers players
Dayton Ducks players
Montreal Royals players
New Orleans Pelicans (baseball) players